Mir Rahman Rahmani (born 1962) is an Afghan politician and businessman who is the current de jure Speaker of Afghanistan's House of the People (Wolesi Jirga, the House of Representatives), holding the office since June 2019, until his flight from Afghanistan in 2021. He has been a member of the Wolesi Jirga since 2010.

On 29 June 2019, he was elected as Speaker of the Wolesi Jirga, receiving 136 votes; the other candidate, Mohammad Wardak, received 96 votes.

In August 2020 Rahmani was exposed in the Cyprus Papers, an Al Jazeera investigation which alleged that he had bought Cypriot citizenship.

Following the fall of Kabul into the control of the Taliban, Rahmani was reported to have fled into Pakistan.

References

Members of the House of the People (Afghanistan)
Speakers of the House of the People (Afghanistan)
Living people
1962 births